Lisa Larsen (1925-1959) was a pioneering woman photojournalist.

Biography
Born in Germany, Lisa Larsen moved in the 1930s to the United States as a teenager where she graduated early from college at just 17.

Early career
Employed at the photography agency Black Star, as an office worker, she was apprenticed by Vogue, then freelanced for several years through Graphics House agency. Her assignments came from the New York Times Magazine, Parade, Glamour, Vogue, Charm and Holiday.

Life magazine
After 1948, the bulk of Larsen’s photojournalism was contract work for LIFE on which she served on staff from 1949 to 1959. Initially she was assigned mainly entertainment, celebrity and fashion stories, including the Vanderbilts, Kennedys, Bing Crosby, and the Duke of Windsor. However she picked up political stories; a Brooklyn police inquiry, the official post-election portrait of First Lady Bess Truman and her daughter Margaret; the Dwight D. Eisenhower presidential campaign in 1950;  the John F. Kennedy-Jacqueline Bouvier wedding in 1953; campaigning by Vice President Alben Barkley (who referred to Larsen as “Mona Lisa,”); and the McCarthy rally of November 29, 1954, in Madison Square Garden, at which the crowd booed at the mention of The New York Times, and when Larsen entered, who was by then well-known, a near-riot erupted and while police escorted her from the hall, a voice shouted 'Hang the Communist bitch!'

International correspondent

Fluent in French, English, German and speaking some Danish and Russian, Larsen was assigned international stories from the early 1950s; Iran’s Premier Mohammed Mossadegh from his New York hospital bed, where she photographed him during the 1951 Iranian oil dispute with Great Britain, invited her to visit Iran for a two weeks in 1952 to photograph in Isfahan, Qom, Persepolis, and Shiraz; photographing Vijaya Lakshmi Pandit, the first female president of the United Nations General Assembly (1953); Queen Elizabeth II’s first royal tour; and the Institute of Nutrition of Central America and Panama in 1954, where she talked to doctors, inspected labs, and went into the field to cover the assignment. A photograph from the latter assignment was selected by Edward Steichen for the 1955 world-touring Museum of Modern Art exhibition The Family of Man that was seen by 9 million visitors. It shows a broadly smiling young Guatemalan mother with a baby on her back in a sling, into which two little girls peer with evident delight. The tropical setting is apparent from the palm fronds in the background and the image is full of human warmth.

At the 1955 Bandung Conference promoting ties between Africa and Asia in Indonesia which Larson covered with Howard Sochurek, she used a small portable tape recorder and two Leica cameras, and was often mentioned in the local press as an object of popular admiration. She then traveled through Hong Kong, Japan, Vietnam, Cambodia, Laos, and China, spending four months in Moscow in 1956, where she attracted the admiration of Nikita Khrushchev.

Portraits
Larsen was noted by Life magazine editors for her capacity to gain the trust of portrait subjects. The first nationally-distributed photograph of Truman Capote was published in LIFE Visits Yaddo, a photo-essay by Larsen in the July 15, 1946 issue which includes a double portrait of Capote sitting at the feet of Marguerite Young. Larson was the only photographic correspondent permitted to photograph Yugoslavian leader Marshall Josip Tito at the Black Sea resort of Sochi, Russia during his visit to the Soviet Union, and the first American photographer permitted to visit Outer Mongolia in over ten years in the summer of 1956, through invitation of the Mongolian ambassador whom she met in Moscow. LIFE, July 22, 1957, 56-65, published many of her photographs taken in Mongolia by Lisa Larsen, who accompanied The New York Times' Jack Raymond. In 1957 she reported on the social aftermath of the Polish Revolution and its effects on politics, industry, culture, and religion, and on displaced Hungarian refugees at camps in Yugoslavia, Germany, Switzerland, and Austria. Photo-editor-in-chief, Władysław Sławnyhe of the Polish illustrated weekly newspaper Świat (The World, 1951–1969), determined to keep pace with Western counterparts Life, Paris Match and Picture Post during the Cold War so published pictures by Larsen, Magnum photographers and her other Western colleagues. After covering Khrushchev again in 1958, on the anniversary of the 1945 “Liberation by the Red Army”, the American National Press Photographers Association awarded her 'Magazine Photographer of the Year' in 1958, the first female photographer to receive it, and the last for another forty years. Her works from Poland and Mongolia were presented that year in a solo exhibition at the Overseas Press Club in New York.

She said;

Tributes
Larsen was treated for breast cancer in 1957, was well enough to accept her Overseas Press Club Award the following year, and continued her assignments in Poland, but died in 1959 after developing tumours in her neck. LIFE remembered her in their March 23 editorial;

Exhibitions 

 1950 Color Photography, May 9–July 4, 1950, The Museum of Modern Art
 1950 Photographs by 51 Photographers, August 1–September 17, 1950 The Museum of Modern Art 
 1951 Memorable Life Photographs, November 20–December 12, 1951 The Museum of Modern Art
 1955 The Family of Man January 24–May 8, 1955 The Museum of Modern Art
 1957 Photographs by Lisa Larsen, Jan 15–Mar 30, 1957, Art Institute of Chicago 
1958 Photographs by Larsen from Poland and Mongolia, Overseas Press Club, New York.
 1958 70 Photographers Look at New York November 27, 1957 – April 15, 1958 The Museum of Modern Art
 1964 Art in a Changing World: 1884–1964: Edward Steichen Photography Center May 27, 1964 The Museum of Modern Art
 2017 UNGARN 56: Bilder einer Revolution, 20 Oct 2016 – 29 Jan 2017 Westlicht, Austria
 2011 American way of LIFE, 2 Nov – 24 Dec 2011, Galerie Stephen Hoffman, Germany 
 2005 Woman of LIFE, 7 Jul – 12 Aug 2005, Alan Klotz Gallery, USA
 2018 University of Michigan Museum of Art: LIFE Magazine 1947 Homecoming Photographs, August 25 - November 18, 2018

Awards

 1953 Magazine Photographer of the Year 
 1958 Overseas Press Club award

References

20th-century American photographers
American photojournalists
German photojournalists
German women photographers
1925 births
1959 deaths
20th-century American women photographers
Women photojournalists